Yenny Andrea Acuña Berrios (born 18 May 1997) is a Chilean footballer who plays as a forward for Brazilian club Bahia and the Chile women's national team.

Club career
Acuña started her career on Deportes Iquique. After 2020 campaign and scoring 19 goals, Acuña joined to Santiago Morning. She scored the first goal, a "Rabona" shoot, in the 2020 Chilean final against Universidad de Chile, was victory for Morning 2-0.

In Feberuary 2023, she joined Brazilian club Bahia.

International career
Acuña made her senior debut on 13 April 2021 in a 0-0 draw against Cameroon for the Olympics Intercontinental Play-offs Women.

References

External links
 

1997 births
Living people
People from Iquique
Chilean women's footballers
Chilean expatriate women's footballers
Women's association football forwards
Deportes Iquique footballers 
Santiago Morning (women) footballers
Esporte Clube Bahia players 
Chile women's international footballers
Footballers at the 2020 Summer Olympics
Olympic footballers of Chile
Chilean expatriate sportspeople in Brazil
Expatriate women's footballers in Brazil